The Stephens Stock, also known as the Stephens Stock Mountain Cur or simply the Stephens Cur, is a breed of cur from the United States.

Overview
The breed has a short coat that is black in color with some white markings on the extremities, it has a small head with a narrow muzzle which gives the impression of a sleek hound. A high-energy breed, the Stephens Stock possesses strong hunting instincts and adapts poorly to being kept as a pet.

The Stephens Stock was developed by the Stephens family from southeast Kentucky who for over a century maintained a distinct line of Mountain Cur, eventually in 1970 it was determined that this line of dogs was so distinctive that it was declared to be a separate breed. Hugh Stephens is considered the founder of the modern breed, it was recognised by the United Kennel Club in 1998.

The Stephens Stock is predominantly used to hunt squirrel and raccoon; too small to hunt black bear and cougar singly, when hunted as a pack they are considered to have sufficient courage to take on either species.

See also
 Dogs portal
 List of dog breeds

References

Dog breeds originating in the United States
Curs